ESPN Xtra is a satellite radio station that carries sports talk programming produced by ESPN. The channel was originally on XM 141, but is now broadcast on Sirius XM Radio channel 81.

In February 2008, three shows from local ESPN Radio owned-and-operated stations were added to the new ESPN Xtra lineup, including The Michael Kay Show, and The Max Kellerman Show, both from WEPN, and Galloway and Company from KESN (on a 4-hour delay). Bill Simmons's The B.S. Report podcast from ESPN.com also aired on the new channel. In addition, the channel will air exclusive content to satellite radio throughout the year, and will include live events, such as the ESPY Awards and the X Games.

XM announced the addition of this channel on January 28, 2008.  Sirius Satellite Radio announced changes to its audio simulcast of ESPNEWS, now called ESPN All Access, on December 12, 2007, but would not be adding any content announced for XM, as it will be exclusive to XM.

On March 9, 2009, Max Kellerman was released from his WEPN contract, after disputes over his show at the station. The Brandon Tierney Show would be airing in the time slot, until a permanent show was in place.

As of 2014, the station no longer carries the simulcasts of local ESPN shows. It mainly simulcasts ESPN's debate shows, including Get Up!, First Take, Around the Horn, Jalen & Jacoby, Highly Questionable, and Pardon the Interruption. Paul Finebaum's SEC Network show airs in afternoon drive, with the rest of the schedule being audio simulcasts of SportsCenter from either ESPNEWS or whatever ESPN network is airing that show at the time. ESPN Xtra is also used as an overflow channel for live sports broadcasts, particularly for Major League Baseball, and serves as the satellite radio outlet for the XFL.

References

External links
 

Xtra
Radio stations established in 2008
Sirius XM Radio channels
Sports radio in the United States